The women's handball tournament at the 2009 Mediterranean Games was held from 26 June to 4 July in Chieti.

Preliminary round
All times are local (UTC+2).

Group A

Group B

Playoffs

Bracket

Semifinals

Seventh place game

Fifth place game

Bronze medal game

Gold medal game

Final standings

References

Women
Mediterranean Games